Petr Korda was the defending champion but lost in the quarterfinals to Fabrice Santoro.

Stefan Edberg won in the final 7–6(7–4), 6–1 against MaliVai Washington.

Seeds
A champion seed is indicated in bold text while text in italics indicates the round in which that seed was eliminated. The top eight seeds received a bye to the second round.

Draw

Finals

Top half

Section 1

Section 2

Bottom half

Section 3

Section 4

References
 1992 Volvo International Draw (Archived 2009-06-15)

Singles